Bifascioides is a genus of moth in the family Cosmopterigidae.

Species
Bifascioides leucomelanella (Rebel, 1916)
Bifascioides sindonia (Meyrick, 1911)
Bifascioides yemenellus (Amsel, 1961)

References
Natural History Museum Lepidoptera genus database

Chrysopeleiinae
Moth genera